Stephanie West,  (née Pickard) is a British classical scholar specialising in the study of Homer, Herodotus, and Lycophron.

Career
West went to school at Nottingham Girls' High School. In 1959, West (then Pickard) won the Gaisford Prize for Greek Verse while a student at Somerville. She had previously won the First Craven Scholarship. From 1965 to 1967, West was a Mary Ewart Research Fellow at Somerville College, Oxford. From 1966 to 2005, she was a lecturer in classics at Hertford College, Oxford. From 1981 to 2005, she was also a lecturer in Greek at Keble College, Oxford. She was the Fellow Librarian of Hertford from 1990 to 2005.

She is an honorary fellow  of Hertford College. In 1990, she was elected as a Fellow of the British Academy (FBA), the United Kingdom's national academy for the humanities and social sciences. She was elected as a Foreign Member of the Polish Academy of Arts and Sciences in 2012.

In recognition of her work for the college a photograph of West featured in the all-female portrait gallery on the walls of the great hall of Hertford College. The gallery was established in 2014 to celebrate the 40th anniversary of the first female fellows elected to the college.

Personal life
West met her eventual husband Martin West (d. 2015), a fellow Classicist, in 1960 at a lecture by former chair in Latin Eduard Fraenkel at Corpus Christi College, Oxford. The pair married in 1960, in Nottingham, and lived together in Polstead Road, Oxford.

Selected publications
1967. The Ptolemaic papyri of Homer
1981. Omero, Odissea 1 (libri I-IV)
1988. A commentary on Homer's Odyssey
2002. Demythologisation in Herodotus

References

Fellows of the British Academy
Living people
British women archaeologists
Classical archaeologists
British archaeologists
Women classical scholars
Fellows of Somerville College, Oxford
Year of birth missing (living people)